Keith Charles may refer to:

 Keith Charles (Six Feet Under), character on the American TV series Six Feet Under
 Keith Charles (actor) (1934–2008), American theatre and television actor

See also